JNO may refer to:

People
 Joshua Nathan Ortanez (born 2000; stagename: JNO) Filipino American Singer
 "Jno.", abbreviation of the given name John 
 Jeffrey Hatrix (born 1963; stagename: JNo) U.S. singer-songwriter
 J. N. O. Fernando, Sri Lankan chemist
 JNO Racing (motorsports) a race car team that participated in the 1972 Can-Am season

Other uses
 JNO (Jump No Overflow), a machine code instruction in x86 for arithmetic overflow, see Branch (computer science)
 Workers Nationalist Youth (JNO) of the Valencian Community in Spain

See also

 
 
 
 John (disambiguation)
 JON (disambiguation)
 ONJ (disambiguation)
 OJN (disambiguation)
 NJO (disambiguation)
 NOJ (disambiguation)